Palorchestidae is an extinct family of diprotodont marsupials whose members are sometimes referred to as marsupial tapirs due to their superficial similarity to true tapirs.

Genera
The family consists of the following four genera:

 Propalorchestes (Murray, 1986)
 Ngapakaldia (Stirton, 1967)
 Palorchestes (Owen, 1873)
 Pitikantia dailyi (Stirton, 1967)

References

External links
 

Prehistoric vombatiforms
Prehistoric mammals of Australia
Miocene marsupials
Pliocene marsupials
Pleistocene marsupials
Clawed herbivores
Chattian first appearances
Pleistocene extinctions
Prehistoric mammal families